The River Trade Terminal (RTT) is the only container terminal in Hong Kong for river cargo. The operator is known as River Trade Terminal Company Limited. Located in Siu Lang Shui / Pillar Point, within Tuen Mun Town, Tuen Mun District, it mainly handles and consolidates container and bulk cargo from upstream prior to dispatch to Kwai Tsing Container Terminals and vice versa.

The company was established in 1996 and the terminal was completed in 1999. The terminal occupies a  site in Tuen Mun with 49 berths along  of quay front. Its shareholders include Hutchison Whampoa and Sun Hung Kai Properties.

References

External links
 

Ports and harbours of Hong Kong
Transport companies established in 1996
CK Hutchison Holdings
Sun Hung Kai Properties
Tuen Mun
1996 establishments in Hong Kong